Campus Studios is an independent film studio which develops, produces, and distributes films, focusing on audience testing and instruction of filmmakers and film viewers. Its first film, Fire Creek, was released digitally for select theaters in Utah May 8, 2009.

Their three-fold mission is the following:
Produce and distribute independent movies for filmmakers
Sell studio movies at great prices
Teach audiences how to view movies critically for themselves

History 
Campus Studios promotes thoughtful movies for families and friends to view together and discuss afterward.  They believe our movies encourage better family communication that will affect other areas of family life.

Filmography 
Fire Creek (2009)

References

External links 
Campus Studios | Official Website

American film studios